Dune 7 is the highest dune in Namibia.

References

Dunes of Namibia
Walvis Bay